Shadows in the Palace (literally "(servant-)women of the palace") is a 2007 South Korean film directed by Kim Mee-jung. The mystery thriller is a fictionalized account of gungnyeo, court maids during South Korea's Joseon era.

This is Kim Mee-jung's first feature film. She previously worked as part of the directing staff in King and the Clown (2005) and Shadows in the Palace was filmed on the same set.

Plot
The film is set amongst a group of gungnyeo, or palace women in Korea during the time of the Joseon dynasty, and is primarily about the hidden dynamics that unfold between them. Sworn into secrecy, submission, and celibacy, the women of the palace officially devote their lives to the well-being of the royal family. Currently, the kingdom has no heir to the throne, and at such a time, the royal concubine Hee-bin (Yoon Se-ah) has given birth to a son. The queen mother wishes for the queen to adopt the child as her own, but Hee-bin hesitates proceeding with this, fearing she will be disposed of once the adoption is official.

One morning, as the court maids go about their work, one of them, Wol-ryung (Seo Young-hee), also Hee-bin's most trusted maid, is found dead, hanging from the rafters of the palace roof. Initially assuming it to be suicide, Chun-ryung (Park Jin-hee), the royal medic, discovers as she proceeds with the autopsy that Wol-ryung was actually strangled. She also discovers that there are signs that the maid had given birth at some time in the past, which would have been absolutely forbidden under palace rules. Ignoring orders from her superiors to wrap up the case quickly, Chun-ryung sets off in search of answers.

Amidst a tangled web involving suspicion of Wol-ryung's involvement in an affair with a teacher at the nearby school, the torture of a mute court maid, a beheading, and finally the records of the king's nightly visits to his concubine, an elaborate scheme spearheaded by Hee-bin's advisor transpires, where Wol-ryung was chosen to bear the crown prince, and later murdered to hide the truth of the baby's origin. When exposed, the advisor imprisons Chun-ryung, overpowers Hee-bin and makes off with the baby. She is however intercepted in the forest by the ghost of Wol-ryung, and is murdered. The ghost later also visits the royal palace, and kills the queen mother, thus removing the last obstacle between the crown prince and the throne.

The baby is later discovered in the forest by Chun-ryung. The next day, as the palace women mourn the death of the queen mother in white robes, they simultaneously also witness the coronation of the new prince in the arms of Hee-bin and the transfer of power to new hands.

Cast 
 Park Jin-hee as Chun-ryung
 Yoon Se-ah as Hee-bin
 Seo Young-hee as Wol-ryung
 Im Jung-eun as Ok-jin 
 Jeon Hye-jin as Jung-ryul
 Kim Sung-ryung as Inspector
 Kim Nam-jin as Lee Hyung-ik
 Kim Mi-kyung as gungnyeo Shim
 Nam Jeong-hee as gungnyeo Noh
 Kim Hak-sun as the king
 Lee Yong-yi as gungnyeo Cheon
 Go Seo-hee as the queen
 Chu Kwi-jung as gungnyeo Uhm
 Moon Ga-young as Il-won
 Ye Soo-jung as the queen mother
 Son Young-soon as chief gungyeo
 Park Soo-young as government official
 Han Ye-rin as Sook-young

Awards and nominations
2007 Blue Dragon Film Awards
 Nomination – Best Supporting Actress – Im Jung-eun
 Nomination – Best New Director – Kim Mee-jung
 Nomination – Best Lighting – Park Se-mun

2007 Korean Film Awards
 Best New Director – Kim Mee-jung
 Nomination – Best Supporting Actress – Jeon Hye-jin

2007 Women in Film Korea Awards
 Film of the Year

2008 Baeksang Arts Awards
 Nomination – Best New Director – Kim Mee-jung

2008 Buil Film Awards
 Nomination – Best Supporting Actress – Seo Young-hee
 Nomination – Best New Director – Kim Mee-jung
 Nomination – Best Lighting – Park Se-mun

2008 Chunsa Film Art Awards
 Best Lighting – Park Se-mun

2008 Grand Bell Awards
 Best Lighting – Park Se-mun
 Nomination – Best Actress – Park Jin-hee
 Nomination – Best Supporting Actress – Kim Sung-ryung
 Nomination – Best New Director – Kim Mee-jung
 Nomination – Best Cinematography – Lee Hyung-deok
 Nomination – Best Art Direction – Lee Ha-jun
 Nomination – Best Lighting – Park Se-mun
 Nomination – Best Costume Design – Shim Hyun-sub
 Nomination – Best Sound – Oh Seong-jin

2008 Golden Cinematography Awards
 Best Actress – Park Jin-hee

2008 Fantasia Festival 
 Best Actress – Park Jin-hee

References

External links 
 
 
 

2007 films
2000s mystery thriller films
South Korean historical thriller films
2000s historical thriller films
South Korean mystery thriller films
South Korean detective films
Films set in the 17th century
Films set in the Joseon dynasty
Films set in Seoul
Cinema Service films
2000s Korean-language films
2007 directorial debut films
2000s South Korean films